The Ministry of Martyrs and Disabled Affairs or MoMDA or MMD is a Ministry of the Government of Afghanistan responsible for martyrs and disabled persons. The current minister is Abdul Majeed Akhund.

History

Ministers

References

External links
Official site

Government ministries of Afghanistan
Disability in Afghanistan